Ion Baboie (born 12 April 1914, date of death unknown) was a Romanian racewalker. He competed in the men's 50 kilometres walk at the 1952 Summer Olympics.

References

External links
 Ion Baboie at the Comitetul Olimpic si Sportiv Roman

1914 births
Year of death missing
Athletes (track and field) at the 1952 Summer Olympics
Romanian male racewalkers
Olympic athletes of Romania